Viktoriia Savtsova (born 10 December 1997) is a Ukrainian Paralympic swimmer.

She competed at the 2012 Summer Paralympics, winning a gold medal in the 100 metre breaststroke S6 event, and at the 2016 Summer Paralympics where she won silver medals in the 50 metre freestyle S6, 100 metre freestyle S6 and 100 metre breaststroke SB5 events.

Savtsova also competed at the 2013 IPC Swimming World Championships where she broke the world record and won a gold medal in the 50 metre freestyle event and won silver medals in the 100 metre breaststroke event and the 4 x 50 metre freestyle relay. She also won silver medals in the 100 metre freestyle and 50 metre freestyle events at the 2015 Championships.

References

External links 
 

1997 births
Living people
Ukrainian female freestyle swimmers
S6-classified Paralympic swimmers
Paralympic swimmers of Ukraine
Paralympic gold medalists for Ukraine
Paralympic silver medalists for Ukraine
Paralympic medalists in swimming
Swimmers at the 2012 Summer Paralympics
Swimmers at the 2016 Summer Paralympics
Swimmers at the 2020 Summer Paralympics
Medalists at the 2012 Summer Paralympics
Medalists at the 2016 Summer Paralympics
Medalists at the World Para Swimming Championships
Medalists at the World Para Swimming European Championships
Ukrainian female breaststroke swimmers